Regional 2 South West, (formerly known as South West 1 West) is an English, level six, rugby union league for clubs based in the south-west of England; i.e. Cornwall, Devon, Dorset and Somerset. It is one of twelve leagues at this level in England. When league rugby started in 1986 it was known as South West 2, but in 1996 the division was split into two leagues — South West 1 West and South West 1 East. South West 1 West was renamed Regional 2 South West prior to the 2022–23 season. The champions are promoted to Regional 1 South West (formerly South West Premier) and the bottom two sides are relegated, depending on location, to either Counties 1 Western West, Counties 1 Western North or Counties 1 Southern South.

Chew Valley are the current champions.

Format
The season runs from September to May and comprises twenty-two rounds of matches, with each club playing each of its rivals, home and away. The results of the matches contribute points to the league as follows:
    4 points are awarded for a win
    2 points are awarded for a draw
    0 points are awarded for a loss, however
    1 losing (bonus) point is awarded to a team that loses a match by 7 points or fewer
    1 additional (bonus) point is awarded to a team scoring 4 tries or more in a match

Current season

Participating teams and location

2021–22

Participating teams and location
Ahead of the new season, Stroud RFC (promoted as Western Counties North champions in 2019–20) withdrew from the league, leaving thirteen teams in this seasons competition. Ten of the teams in this seasons competition competed in 2019–20. The 'previous season' column in the table below refers to 2019–20 not 2020–21, which was cancelled due to the Covid-19 pandemic. Of the thirteen teams competing in this seasons competition, five are from Somerset, four from Gloucester, three from Devon and one from Cornwall. The season started on 4 September 2021 and the final matches were played on 23 April 2022. 

Chew Valley won the competition for the first time, just one point ahead of both Devonport Services and Lydney, in 2nd and 3rd place respectively. Owing to the reorganisation of the league system for next season, an announcement is awaited from the RFU as to which league teams will be allocated to.

League table

2020–21
Due to the COVID-19 pandemic the season was cancelled.

2019–20

Participating teams and location

League table

2018–19

Participating teams and location

League table

Promotion play-off
This seasons play-off for promotion to the South West Premier was between Launceston and Old Centralians. Launceston had the better playing record and hosted the match at Polson Bridge, winning 33 – 22. This was the 19th play-off match, the first for Launceston and the second for Old Centralians who won promotion 2013. It was the 13th win for the home team and south-west teams have also won the match on 13 occasions.

2017–18

Participating teams and location
The 2017–18 South West 1 West consists of fourteen teams; five from Devon, four each from Gloucestershire and Somerset, and one from Cornwall. Ten of the fourteen teams participated in last season's competition. The season started on 2 September 2016 and the last league matches were played on 21 April 2017. The play-off match was played a week later on 28 April 2017.

League table

Promotion play-off
This seasons play-off for promotion to the South West Premier was between Exeter University and Banbury. Over the season Exeter University had the better playing record and hosted the match at Topsham Sports Ground, winning 41 – 32. This was the 18th play-off match and the first for each of the teams; it was the 12th win for the home team and south-west teams have also won the match on 12 occasions. Banbury's total of 32 points was the most by a losing team and also the most by an away team.

2016–17

Participating teams and location
The 2016–17 South West 1 West consists of fourteen teams; six from Somerset and four each from Devon and Gloucestershire. Ten of the fourteen teams participated in last season's competition. The season started on 3 September 2016 and the last league matches were played on 22 April 2017. The play-off match was played a week later on 29 April 2017.

League table

Promotion play-off
Each season, the runners-up in South West 1 East and South West 1 West, participate in a play-off for promotion to National League 3 South West. The team with the best playing record, in this case Newbury Blues, host the match and they beat their opponents Clevedon 25 – 22.

2015–16
Camborne became champions on 9 April 2016, with two matches to play. Thornbury lost the play-off for promotion 24 – 26 at Salisbury  and will continue to play in this league next season. Avonmouth OB, Coney Hill and Wells are all relegated to Western Counties North.

Participating teams and location
The 2015–16 South West 1 West consisted of fourteen teams; six from Somerset, four from Gloucestershire, two from Devon and one each from Bristol and Cornwall. Nine of the fourteen teams participated in last season's competition. The 2014–15 champions Cleve, and Ivybridge (via the play-off) were promoted to National League 3 South West. The relegated teams, Cullompton and St Austell will play in Western Counties West, and Matson will play in Western Counties North. The season started on 5 September 2015 and the last matches were played on 30 April 2016.

League table

Promotion play-off
Each season, the runners-up in South West 1 East and South West 1 West, participate in a play-off for promotion to National League 3 South West. The team with the best playing record, in this case Salisbury, host the match and their opponents are Thornbury.

2014–15
Cleve became champions with two matches to play and are promoted to National League 3 South West for next season. The team in second place, Ivybridge beat Towcestrians (the runner-up of South West 1 East) 25 – 20 in the play-off for promotion. St Austell and Cullompton are relegated to Western Counties West and Matson are relegated to Western Counties North.

Participating teams and location
The 2014–15 South West 1 West League consists of fourteen teams; four from Somerset, three each from Devon and Gloucestershire and two each from Bristol and Cornwall. The season started on 6 September 2014 and the last league matches were played on 18 April 2015; the play-off match was played a week later. Nine of the teams listed below participated in the South West 1 West last season. They were joined by Avonmouth OB who were relegated from National League 3 South West, Drybrook and Matson both promoted from Western Counties North, Ivybridge promoted from Western Counties West and Wells promoted from Southern Counties South.

League table

Promotion play-off
Each season, the runners-up in South West 1 East and South West 1 West, participate in a play-off for promotion to National League 3 South West. The team with the best playing record, in this case Towcestrians, hosts the match; their opponents were Ivybridge  who won 25 – 20.

2013–14

Participating teams and location

2012–13
Bridgwater & Albion (relegated from National League 3 South West)
Camborne
Chard
Cleve
Clevedon
Cullompton
North Dorset
North Petherton
Old Redcliffians (relegated from National League 3 South West)
Oldfield Old Boys
Paignton Saxons
Sidmouth
Thornbury
Wadebridge Camels

Original teams
When league rugby began in 1987 this division (known as South West 2) contained the following teams:

Barnstaple
Berry Hill
Brixham
Cinderford
Devon & Cornwall Police
Devonport Services
Henley
Launceston
Newbury
Reading
Reading Abbey

South West 1 West honours

South West 2 (1987–1993)

Originally South West 1 West and South West 1 East were combined in a single division called South West 2.  It was a tier 6 league with promotion up to South West 1 and relegation down to either Western Counties or Southern Counties.

South West 2
The top six teams from South West 1 and the top six from London 1 were combined to create National 5 South, meaning that South West 2 dropped to become a tier 7 league.  Promotion continued to South West 1 and relegation to either Western Counties or Southern Counties.

South West 2 West (1996–2009)
League restructuring by the RFU for the 1996–97 season saw South West 2 split into two regional divisions known as South West 2 West and South West 2 East, and the cancellation of National 5 South meant that both divisions became tier 6 leagues. Promotion continued to South West 1, while relegation was now to either Western Counties North or Western Counties West.

South West 1 West (2009–present)
League restructuring by the RFU meant that South West 2 West and South East 2 East were renamed as South West 1 West and South West 1 East, with both leagues remaining at tier 6. Promotion was to National League 3 South West, while relegation continued to either Western Counties North or Western Counties West.

Promotion play-offs
From season 2000–01 through to 2018–19 there has been a play-off, between the league runners-up of South West 1 East and South West 1 West, for the third and final promotion place to South West Premier. The team with the superior league record had home advantage. At the end of the 2018–19 season the South West 1 West teams' have been the stronger with thirteen wins to the South West 1 East teams' six, while the home team has won promotion thirteen times to the away teams six.

Number of league titles

Cinderford (2)
Hornets (2)
Matson (2)
Old Patesians (2)
Truro (2)
Berry Hill (1)
Camborne (1)
Chew Valley (1)
Chippenham (1)
Cleve (1)
Coney Hill (1)
Drybrook (1)
Exmouth (1)
Gloucester Old Boys (1)
Gordon League (1)
Hartpury College (1)
Henley (1)
Launceston (1)
Mounts Bay (1)
Okehampton (1)
Old Redcliffians (1)
Penzance-Newlyn (1)
Spartans (1)
St Mary's Old Boys (1)
Stroud (1)
Taunton Titans (1)
Weston-super-Mare (1)

Summary of tier six format since 1987

Notes

See also
 South West Division RFU
 Cornwall RFU
 Devon RFU
 Gloucestershire RFU
 Somerset RFU
 English rugby union system

References

 RFU(2011) "Rugby First" Available at: https://web.archive.org/web/20101104233314/http://clubs.rfu.com/Fixtures/MatchByDivision.aspx?DivID=69886542 Accessed:29 January 2011

Recurring sporting events established in 1987
6
Rugby union in Bristol
Rugby union leagues in Cornwall
Rugby union in Devon
Sport in Gloucester
Rugby union in Gloucestershire
Rugby union in Somerset
Sports leagues established in 1987